Eric Williams (born 27 November 1977) is a Nigerian former swimmer, who specialized in breaststroke events. He represented Nigeria at the 2004 Summer Olympics, and in all three editions of the FINA World Championships since 2003.

At the 2004 Summer Olympics in Athens, Williams competed only in the men's 100 m breastroke, qualifying under a Universality place from FINA in an entry time of 1:09.60. He blasted a Nigerian record of 1:07.69 to lead the first heat against Zambia's Chisela Kanchela, Kenya's Amar Shah, and Nepal's Alice Shrestha. Williams failed to advance into the semifinals, as he placed fifty-third overall out of 60 swimmers on the first day of preliminaries.

References

1977 births
Living people
Nigerian male swimmers
Olympic swimmers of Nigeria
Swimmers at the 2004 Summer Olympics
Commonwealth Games competitors for Nigeria
Swimmers at the 2002 Commonwealth Games
Male breaststroke swimmers
21st-century Nigerian people